Vazirabad (also Romanized as Vazīrābād; also known as Yazdābād and Yezdābād) is a village in Garkan-e Shomali Rural District, Pir Bakran District, Falavarjan County, Isfahan Province, Iran. At the 2006 census, its population was 201, in 65 families.

References 

Populated places in Falavarjan County